James McPherson (20 November 1842 – 23 August 1891) was an Australian cricketer. He played one first-class cricket match for Victoria in 1866.

See also
 List of Victoria first-class cricketers

References

1842 births
1891 deaths
Australian cricketers
Victoria cricketers
Cricketers from Melbourne
People from Moonee Ponds, Victoria